Franz Anton Gottfried Frölich (1805 – 1878) was a German entomologist who specialised in Lepidoptera.

He is not to be confused with Josef Aloys Frölich, his father, also an entomologist but specialising in Coleoptera. Franz Anton Gottfried Frölich wrote several supplements to the works of Jacob Hubner — See Francis Hemming, "Hübner: A bibliographical and systematic account of the entomological works of Jacob Hübner, and of the supplements thereto by Carl Geyer, Gottfried Franz von Frölich, and Gottlieb August Wilhelm Herrich-Schäffer". London: Royal Entomological Society of London, 1937. 2 volumes.

References
Speidel, W. Aarvik, L.(2002) Synonyms of European Tortricidae and Noctuidae, with special reference to the publications of Hubner, Geyer and Frolich.Nota Lepidopterogica 25:17-22.

1805 births
1878 deaths
German lepidopterists
Date of birth missing
Date of death missing
19th-century German zoologists